The 2001 Icelandic Men's Football League Cup was the sixth staging of the Icelandic Men's League Cup. It featured all the 2000 Úrvalsdeild karla teams and the top 6 teams from 1. deild karla in 2000.

The competition started on 15 February 2001  and concluded on 6 May 2001 with KR beating FH 5-3 on penalties in the final.

Details
 The 16 teams from were divided into 2 groups of 8 teams. Each team played one match against each of the other teams in the group. The top 4 teams from each group qualified for the quarter-finals.

Group stage

Group A

Group B

Knockout stage

Quarter-finals

Semi-finals

Final

See also
Icelandic Men's Football Cup
Knattspyrnusamband Íslands - The Icelandic Football Association
Icelandic First Division League 2001

References

RSSSF Page - Deildabikar 2001

2001 domestic association football cups
2001 in Icelandic football
Icelandic Men's Football League Cup